Ahn Jae-hyun (born July 1, 1987) is a South Korean model and actor. He is best known for his roles in television dramas such as You're All Surrounded (2014), Blood (2015), Cinderella with Four Knights (2016), Reunited Worlds (2017), The Beauty Inside (2018), and Love with Flaws (2019).

Career
Ahn Jae-hyun began his entertainment career as a fashion model in 2009, appearing in runway shows, magazine editorials and commercials. He gained recognition in 2011 while playing a delivery man in the cable variety show Lee Soo-geun and Kim Byung-man's High Society. He also appeared in several music videos, including "Sad Song" by Baek A-yeon, "Please Don't" by K.Will, and "Gone Not Around Any Longer" by Sistar19.
In 2013, Ahn's popularity rose while playing actress Jun Ji-hyun's younger brother in the hit drama My Love from Another Star. This led to more acting offers in 2014, including a role in police comedy You're All Surrounded and the webtoon film adaptation Fashion King. The same year, he was appointed to be MC for Mnet's weekly music program M Countdown.

In 2015, Ahn played his first leading role as a vampire doctor in Blood, and appeared in the two-episode fantasy drama Snow Lotus Flower alongside Lee Ji-ah.

In 2016, Ahn starred in tvN's romantic comedy series Cinderella with Four Knights, playing a chaebol and playboy vying for the main female lead's heart. He won the Top Excellence Award at the 9th Korea Drama Awards for his performance. He also joined the cast of travel reality show New Journey to the West, replacing Lee Seung-gi who enlisted in the army. The same year, he starred in the Chinese romance film Perfect Imperfection alongside Taiwanese actress Ady An.

In 2017, Ahn was cast as the second lead in SBS's fantasy romance drama Reunited Worlds. In 2018, Ahn was cast in the romance melodrama The Beauty Inside.

In 2019, Ahn returned to the small screen with a lead role in the romantic comedy drama Love with Flaws starring opposite Oh Yeon-seo.

In 2022, An will publish his first photo essay List of Things to Remember, which will go on sale June 8, 2022 at offline bookstores nationwide. Later in February 2023, Ahn donated 10 million won from the 2022 exhibition to help orphans who have suffered from the coronavirus.

Personal life
On March 11, 2016, Ahn was confirmed to be dating his Blood co-star Ku Hye-sun since April 2015. The couple officially registered their marriage at the Gangnam district office on May 20, 2016, and married on May 21, 2016. They announced that instead of holding a wedding party, they would donate money to the pediatric ward of Severance Hospital, one of the oldest and biggest hospitals in Korea. The pair later appeared in the reality show Newlywed Diary produced by Na Young-seok, showcasing their married life. 

In August 2019, it was reported Ahn requested a divorce from his wife. Ahn submitted an application to the Seoul Family Court on September 9, 2019 for divorce against Ku, and it was delivered to Ku on September 18, 2019. On October 21, 2019, he deleted all the photos on his Instagram account, which was speculated by the media to be an attempt to prevent further unnecessary issues and controversy about the divorce ahead of his upcoming TV series Love with Flaws.

Filmography

Film

Television series

Reality show

Music video appearances

Discography

Awards and nominations

References

External links 

Male actors from Seoul
South Korean male models
South Korean male film actors
South Korean male television actors
1987 births
Living people